HORTA is an underground geographic positioning technology utilized in the mining industry and being considered for extraterrestrial space mining applications. The technology utilizes a gyroscope and an accelerometer, together called an inertial navigation system or INS, to aid in 3D-position determination.

It was developed by Canadian mining company Inco in the late 1990s based on an earlier technology that had been originally developed for the United States Armed Forces. It provides an automated solution to the problem of positioning and location in underground mines.<ref name=cmj2000>
, Canadian Mining Journal, April 2000, accessed 2019-03-09. "HORTA unit for determining the geographic position underground. HORTA-Honeywell Ore Retrieval and Tunneling Aid-is a box containing a gyro and an accelerometer, originally developed for the U.S. military, that solves the problem of positioning and location underground."</ref>

The term is a backronym for the Horta from Star Trek, a new species introduced in the Original Series episode "The Devil in the Dark."
As Inco uses the term, HORTA stands for Honeywell Ore Retrieval and Tunneling Aid.

A mining vehicle "with a HORTA mounted, can survey much faster and more accurately than manual surveys. It takes the truck 120 minutes to survey a 1.6-km-long drift, recording 1,500 points every 60 cm. This compares with a manual survey of the same distance that takes 180 hours, and records only five points every 6 m. Added benefits from such a detailed survey would be to allow engineers to design more effective ventilation systems, or to regularly check ground stability."

HORTA units may be fitted onto all mobile underground equipment, including drills, so their position may be determined with acceptable engineering accuracy.

See also
 Space mining
 Teleoperation

References

External links
 Telerobotic and automated lunar mining: interview with Dr. Greg Baiden, The Space Show'', 2 Jan 2011.

Mining equipment
Geopositioning